Sharon Kopriva (born February 11, 1948) is an American painter and sculptor who lives and works in Houston, Texas and Hope, Idaho. Kopriva's art is influenced by her Catholic primary school education, as well as exposure to Peruvian  and Australian cultures.

Biography 
Sharon (Ortman) Kopriva was raised in Houston. She is the middle child of three born to Lowell (Red) and Rosalie (Rosy) Ortman. Kopriva earned a bachelor's degree in art education from the University of Houston in 1970. She taught art for 10 years in the Houston Independent School District before returning to the University of Houston to earn a master's degree in painting in 1981. The Texas Commission on the Arts named Kopriva State Artist of the Year in 2005 for her three-dimensional visual artwork.

Her teachers include New York painter John Alexander and sculptor James Surls. Her friendship with artists Edward Kienholz and Nancy Reddin Kienholz has also impacted Kopriva's work:

Ed and Nancy Kienholz encouraged Kopriva to expand her sculptural work into larger, more intricately crafted tableaus. … Ed, especially became an important mentor, not only conceptually, but in the craft of actually building these works. Kopriva recounts, “We were driving one day and found this old piano on the side of the road. Ed said, ‘You want that to work with?’ I asked him how I was supposed to get it home. He had a few assistants who took the piece to the studio.” That became the first piano piece, In Excelsis Deo. – Bradley Sumrall, curator, Ogden Museum of Southern Art

Work 
Best known for her sculptures of human figures (often in mummified form) and animals. Kopriva's paintings have been shaped by the mountain forests of Idaho, where she spends her summers.

The natural imagery in Kopriva’s work, especially the tree-thronged cathedrals, draws on her frequent visits to the vast forests and woods of Idaho. … While the imagery in these mixed-media paintings is based on actual observation, it also emerges from venerable literary and artistic tradition of fusing forests and cathedrals through metaphor. – Raphael Rubinstein, art critic

In late 2015, Kopriva returned her focus to figurative sculpture and began a series out of manila rope pieces called Tubors.

Permanent public collections 
 The Art Museum of South Texas, Corpus Christi, Texas, United States
 Art Museum of Southeast Texas, Beaumont, Texas, United States
 Dallas Museum of Art, Dallas, Texas, United States
 Lowe Art Museum, Miami, Florida, United States
 The Menil Collection, Houston, Texas, United States
 Mourtala Diop Collection, Dakar, Senegal
 Museo de Arte, Lima, Peru
 The Museum of Fine Arts, Houston, Texas, United States
 New Mexico Museum of Art, Santa Fe, New Mexico, United States
 New Orleans Museum of Art, New Orleans, Louisiana, United States
 Ogden Museum of Southern Art, New Orleans, Louisiana, United States
 University of Houston, Houston, Texas, United States 
 Vestes, Houston, Texas, United States

Selected exhibitions 
Museums:
2017 - Confluence of Earth & Mind, Martin Museum of Art (Baylor University), Waco, Texas, United States
2015 - Gothic Exposure, Museo Metropolitano de Monterrey, Monterrey, Mexico
2014 - Gothic Green, The Nave Museum, Victoria, Texas, United States
2012 - From Terra to Verde: The Work of Sharon Kopriva, Ogden Museum of Southern Art, New Orleans, Louisiana, United States
2009 - Rezos, Museo de la Ciudad, Querétaro, Mexico
2006 - Roots, Museo de la Nación, Lima, Peru, catalogue
2002 - Kreuz Weg, Die Mönchskirche Museum (The Monk's Church Museum), Salzwedel, Germany
2000 - Sharon Kopriva: Works from 1986 to 1998, The Menil Collection, Houston, Texas, United States, catalogue
1991 - Penances, Art Museum of Southeast Texas, Beaumont, Texas, United States

Galleries:
2017 Muses, Mutts and Mortality, Bale Creek Allen Gallery, Austin, Texas
2017 Confluence of Earth & Mind, Martin Museum of Art, Baylor University, Waco, Texas
2016 Tubers•Tablets•Turfs•Tails, Kirk Hopper Fine Art, Dallas, Texas, United States
2015 Perros Sin Pelo, Flatbed Press and Gallery, Austin, Texas, United States
2014 Illuminations, Deborah Colton Gallery, Houston, Texas, United States
2011 Cathedrals, Phantoms and Naked Dogs, Deborah Colton Gallery, Houston, Texas, United States, catalogue
2011 Phantoms and Milestones, The Strand Art Room, Mumbai, India, catalogue
2010 Martyrs, Ministers and Milestones, Galerie Richard, Berlin, Germany
2009 The Voice of Silence, Taylor/Bercier Fine Art, New Orleans, Louisiana, United States
2007 Faith and War: The Art of Sharon Kopriva and Ed Wilson, Landmark Gallery, Texas Tech University, Lubbock, Texas, United States
2006 Lost Rivers, Zeitkunst Galerie, Halle, Germany
2004 The Backside of Night, Gerald Peters Gallery, Dallas, Texas, United States
2004 Mounds and Monuments, Barbara Davis Gallery, Houston, Texas, United States
2002 Marguerite Oestreicher Fine Arts, New Orleans, Louisiana, United States
2001 Pillsbury & Peters Fine Arts, Dallas, Texas, United States
2001 Texas Artist of the Year Award, Art League of Houston, Houston, Texas, United States
1998 Birds of Pray, Barbara Davis Gallery, Houston, Texas, United States
1997 From Dust Thou Art, Dutch Phillips Gallery, Dallas, Texas, United States
1997 Contemporary Art Month – Sharon Kopriva Drawings and Sculpture, Parchman Stremmel Gallery, San Antonio, Texas, United States
1996 Vessels and Reliquaries, ArtSpace Virginia Miller Galleries, Coral Gables, Florida, United States
1996 Reconciliations, Barbara Davis Gallery, Houston, Texas, United States
1995 New Sculpture, Paintings and Constructions, Dutch Phillips Gallery, Dallas, Texas, United States
1994 New Constructions and Paintings, Hall-Barnett Gallery, New Orleans, Louisiana, United States
1993 LewAllen Gallery, Santa Fe, New Mexico, United States
1992 Conflicting Rituals, Corpus Christi State University, Corpus Christi, Texas, United States, catalogue
1991 Rite of Passage, The Art Center, Waco, Texas, United States, catalogue
1989 Sharon Kopriva: Sculpture and Paintings, J. Rosenthal Gallery, Chicago, Illinois, United States
1989 Sculpture and Paintings, Graham Gallery, Houston, Texas, United States, catalogue
1987 Kindred Spirits, Sydney Payton Gallery, Denver, Colorado, United States

References

Further reading 
Collins, Michael. Exhibition catalogue, Faith and War: The Art of Sharon Kopriva and Ed Wilson, Lubbock, Texas: Landmark Gallery, Texas Tech University, December 2007.
Edwards, Jim. “Sharon Kopriva’s Cathedrals, Phantoms and Naked Dogs.” Exhibition catalogue, Cathedrals, Phantoms and Naked Dogs, Houston, Texas: Deborah Colton Gallery, 2011.
Greene, Alison de Lima. Texas: 150 Works from the Museum of Fine Arts, Museum of Fine Arts, Houston, 2000.
Hopps, Walter. Exhibition catalogue, Sharon Kopriva: 1986–1998, Houston, Texas: The Menil Collection, June 2000.
Johnson, Patricia C. “Artist of the Year,” Houston Chronicle, March 31, 2001.
Michael, Nadia. “Cathedrals, Phantoms and Naked Dogs,” 002 Magazine (Houston), June 2011, pgs. 22–23.
Rose, Barbara and Susie Kalil. Exhibition Catalog, Fresh Paint: The Houston School, Houston, Texas: Museum of Fine Arts, Houston, 1985.
Rubenstein, Raphael. “Sharon Kopriva’s Magical Realism,” Exhibition Catalog, Cathedrals, Phantoms and Naked Dogs, Houston, Texas: Deborah Colton Gallery, May 2011.
Rushing, W. Jackson. “Houston: Sharon Kopriva, The Menil Collection.” Sculpture, November 2000, pgs. 72–73.
Sanchez, Felix. “Mummy Unwinds at Morgue,” The Houston Post, March 15, 1990.
Sumrall, Bradley. From Terra to Verde: The Work of Sharon Kopriva, Ogden Museum of Southern Art, New Orleans, 2012

External links 
 http://www.artnet.com/artists/sharon-kopriva/
 http://www.askart.com/askart/k/sharon_kopriva/sharon_kopriva.aspx
 http://www.deborahcoltongallery.com/2011/content/sharon-kopriva
 http://www.ogdenmuseum.org/index.html

1948 births
Living people
People from Houston
American women painters
American women sculptors
Contemporary sculptors
American contemporary painters
Sculptors from Texas
Painters from Texas
University of Houston alumni
21st-century American women artists